The list of titles and honours of the Swedish Crown sets out the many titles of the monarch of Sweden since the creation of hereditary monarchy of the Kingdom of Sweden in 1544.

Titles held by the monarch of Sweden 
Note: Former titles marked with * are historical titles which are abolished or no longer part of the Swedish crown.

Titles held by the heir apparent of Sweden 

 Crown Prince of Sweden (1778 – present)
 Hereditary Prince of Sweden (1544 – 1778)

References 

Swedish monarchy